Fulham School, originally founded as Fulham Preparatory School, is a school in Fulham, London, teaching children from the age of three up to eighteen (completing the IB). From its beginnings as a pre-prep and preparatory school, in 2017, it moved into also providing secondary education.

The Prep school's buildings in Greyhound Road, Hammersmith, were previously used by Holborn College and from 1981 until 1985 were the film location for the children's television programme Grange Hill.

The school has a new campus at Chesilton Road, Fulham, completed in March 2021, which accommodates 220 students from Year Nine onwards in a new purpose-built building. September 2021 saw the launch of a Sixth Form, following accreditation process for the International Baccalaureate, to be able to offer Sixth Form students the IB Diploma Programme.

References

External links
Fulham School Ofsted reports

Preparatory schools in London
Private schools in the London Borough of Hammersmith and Fulham
Fulham